The women's changquan competitionat the 2018 Asian Games in Jakarta, Indonesia was held on 22 August at the JIExpo Kemayoran Hall B3.

Schedule
All times are Western Indonesia Time (UTC+07:00)

Results

References

External links
Official website

Women's changquan